Obukhovo is a rural locality (a village) in Ilyinskoye Rural Settlement, Kolchuginsky District, Vladimir Oblast, Russia. The population was 14 as of 2010. There are 2 streets.

Geography 
Obukhovo is located 18 km north of Kolchugino (the district's administrative centre) by road. Krasny Ruchey is the nearest rural locality.

References 

Rural localities in Kolchuginsky District